Air Vice Marshal Richard John Bomball,  (born 13 October 1937) is a retired Royal Australian Air Force officer, Assistant Chief of the Air Staff – Development and former Commandant of the Australian Defence Force Academy.

Early life
Born on 13 October 1937, in Richmond, Victoria, Bomball was educated at Mentone Grammar School and joined the RAAF on graduation.

Air Force career

 Entered – Royal Australian Air Force (1956)
 Trained at No. 1 Basic Flying Training School RAAF, Uranquinty, New South Wales and No. 1 Applied Flying Training School RAAF, Point Cook, Victoria.
 Served – No. 25 Squadron, RAAF Pearce, WA (1957–1958), No. 78 Wing, RAAF Butterworth, Malaya (1958–1961), No. 2 Operational Conversion Unit (1964–1969), RAAF Staff College (1969), seconded to Department of Air (1969–1973), Joint Services Staff College (1975), Royal College of Defence Studies, London, (1987). 
 Commanding Officer – No. 3 Squadron, RAAF Butterworth (1973–1974)
 Director of Staff – RAAF Staff College (1975–1978)
 Air Attaché – Australian Embassy, Tokyo (1978–1981)
 Director of Operational Requirements – Air Force – Department of Defence (1982–1983)
 Officer Commanding – RAAF Williamtown, New South Wales (1984–1986)
 Chief of Staff – RAAF HQ Support Command (1987–1988)
 Promoted to Air Vice Marshal (1988)
 Assistant Chief of the Air Staff – Development (1988–1989)
 Commandant – Australian Defence Force Academy (5 March 1990–1993)

Later life
Following his retirement from the Air Force, Bomball was appointed as the first Chairman of the Board of Newcastle Airport Limited in 1993, when control of the airport was transferred from the Commonwealth to joint control by Newcastle City Council and Port Stephens Council. He served until 2004. In 1994 he was appointed to serve on the Veterans' Compensation Review Committee by the Minister for Veterans' Affairs, John Faulkner, subsequently co-authoring a report on compensation for veterans and war widows.

Honours

References

1937 births
Living people
Officers of the Order of Australia
People educated at Mentone Grammar School
Australian recipients of the Air Force Cross (United Kingdom)
Royal Australian Air Force air marshals
Australian military personnel of the Malayan Emergency
Recipients of the Commendation for Valuable Service in the Air